Thompson sampling, named after William R. Thompson, is a heuristic for choosing actions that addresses the exploration-exploitation dilemma in the multi-armed bandit problem. It consists of choosing the action that maximizes the expected reward with respect to a randomly drawn belief.

Description 

In each round, the player obtains a context , plays an action  and receives a reward  following a distribution that depends on the context and the issued action. The aim of the player is to play actions such as to maximize the cumulative rewards.

The elements of Thompson sampling are as follows:
 a likelihood function ;
 a prior distribution  on these parameters;
 past observations triplets ;
 a posterior distribution , where  is the likelihood function.

Thompson sampling consists in playing the action  according to the probability that it maximizes the expected reward; action  is chosen with probability

where  is the indicator function.

In practice, the rule is implemented by sampling. In each round, parameters  are sampled from the posterior , and an action  chosen that maximizes , i.e. the expected reward given the sampled parameters, the action, and the current context. Conceptually, this means that the player instantiates their beliefs randomly in each round according to the posterior distribution, and then acts optimally according to them.  In most practical applications, it is computationally onerous to maintain and sample from a posterior distribution over models.  As such, Thompson sampling is often used in conjunction with approximate sampling techniques.

History 

Thompson sampling was originally described by Thompson in 1933. It was subsequently rediscovered numerous times independently in the context of multi-armed bandit problems. A first proof of convergence for the bandit case has been shown in 1997. The first application to Markov decision processes was in 2000. A related approach (see Bayesian control rule) was published in 2010. In 2010 it was also shown that Thompson sampling is instantaneously self-correcting. Asymptotic convergence results for contextual bandits were published in 2011. Thompson Sampling has been widely used in many online learning problems including A/B testing in website design and online advertising, and accelerated learning in decentralized decision making. A Double Thompson Sampling (D-TS)  algorithm has been proposed for dueling bandits, a variant of traditional MAB, where feedback comes in the form of pairwise comparison.

Relationship to other approaches

Probability matching 

Probability matching is a decision strategy in which predictions of class membership are proportional to the class base rates. Thus, if in the training set positive examples are observed 60% of the time, and negative examples are observed 40% of the time, the observer using a probability-matching strategy will predict (for unlabeled examples) a class label of "positive" on 60% of instances, and a class label of "negative" on 40% of instances.

Bayesian control rule 

A generalization of Thompson sampling to arbitrary dynamical environments and causal structures, known as Bayesian control rule, has been shown to be the optimal solution to the adaptive coding problem with actions and observations. In this formulation, an agent is conceptualized as a mixture over a set of behaviours. As the agent interacts with its environment, it learns the causal properties and adopts the behaviour that minimizes the relative entropy to the behaviour with the best prediction of the environment's behaviour. If these behaviours have been chosen according to the maximum expected utility principle, then the asymptotic behaviour of the Bayesian control rule matches the asymptotic behaviour of the perfectly rational agent.

The setup is as follows. Let  be the actions issued by an agent up to time , and let  be the observations gathered by the agent up to time . Then, the agent issues the action  with probability:

where the "hat"-notation  denotes the fact that  is a causal intervention (see Causality), and not an ordinary observation. If the agent holds beliefs  over its behaviors, then the Bayesian control rule becomes
,
where  is the posterior distribution over the parameter  given actions  and observations .

In practice, the Bayesian control amounts to sampling, at each time step, a parameter  from the posterior distribution , where the posterior distribution is computed using Bayes' rule by only considering the (causal) likelihoods of the observations  and ignoring the (causal) likelihoods of the actions , and then by sampling the action  from the action distribution .

Upper-Confidence-Bound (UCB) algorithms 

Thompson sampling and upper-confidence bound algorithms share a fundamental property that underlies many of their theoretical guarantees.  Roughly speaking, both algorithms allocate exploratory effort to actions that might be optimal and are in this sense "optimistic".  Leveraging this property, one can translate regret bounds established for UCB algorithms to Bayesian regret bounds for Thompson sampling or unify regret analysis across both these algorithms and many classes of problems.

References 

Artificial intelligence
Heuristic algorithms
Sequential methods
Sequential experiments